Velike Lese is a village on the left bank of the Krka River in the Municipality of Ivančna Gorica in central Slovenia. The area is part of the historical region of Lower Carniola. The municipality is now included in the Central Slovenia Statistical Region.

Church

The local church is dedicated to Saint James and belongs to the Parish of Krka. It dates to the second half of the 17th century and was partially rebuilt in the 19th century.

References

External links

Velike Lese on Geopedia

Populated places in the Municipality of Ivančna Gorica